Teboho "Tsietsi" MacDonald Mashinini (born 27 January 1957 – 1990) in Jabavu, Soweto, South Africa, died in the summer of 1990 in Conakry, Guinea, and buried in Avalon Cemetery, was the main student leader of the Soweto Uprising that began in Soweto and spread across South Africa in June, 1976.

Life
Teboho Tsietsi Mashinini known by his pet name "Mcdonald" was born in 1957, 27 January. He was the second of 13 children of Ramothibe (father) and Nomkhitha Virginia (mother) Mashinini. He was bright, popular and successful student at Morris Isaacson High School in Soweto where he was the head of the debate team and president of the Methodist Wesley Guild.

A move by South Africa's apartheid government to make the language Afrikaans an equal mandatory language of education for all South Africans in conjunction with English was extremely unpopular with black and English-speaking South African students.

A student himself, Mashinini planned a mass demonstration by students for 16 June 1976. This demonstration which would become known as the Soweto Uprising lasted for three days during which several hundred people were killed.

Having been identified as the leader of the uprising by the South African government, Mashinini fled South Africa in exile, first to London then later to various other African countries, including Liberia where he was briefly married to Miss Liberia 1977, Welma Campbell.

He died under mysterious circumstances, possibly of homicide, in the summer of 1990 while in exile in Guinea. His body was repatriated to South Africa on 4 August 1990 where he was interred in Avalon Cemetery.  His grave bears the epitaph "Black Power".

Legacy
There is a statue of Teboho Mashinini by Johannes Phokela in the grounds of his old school that was unveiled on 1 May 2010 by Amos Masondo, the Mayor of Johannesburg.

See also
Khotso Seatlholo
Hastings Ndlovu
Hector Pieterson
Murphy Morobe
Seth Mazibuko

References

External links
 The African Activist Archive Project website includes a press release Leader of Soweto (South Africa) Uprising to Speak (New York: American Committee on Africa, December 1976).
Teboho "Tsietsi" Mashinini Profile on SA History Online https://www.sahistory.org.za/people/teboho-tsietsi-mashinini

Anti-apartheid activists
People from Soweto
1957 births
1990 deaths
Members of the Order of Luthuli